"Dare You" is a song by Dutch DJ and record producer Hardwell. It features the vocals from Matthew Koma. It was released on 13 November 2013 and re-released on 5 January 2014 by Revealed Recordings. It entered the UK Singles Chart at number 18, making it the first Hardwell release to chart in the United Kingdom, in January 2014. An acoustic version featuring Koma and Bebe Rexha was released as an iTunes bonus track on Hardwell's debut studio album, United We Are in January, 2015. Rexha only sings background vocals during the chorus.

Music video
A music video to accompany the release of "Dare You" was first released onto YouTube on 5 January 2014 at a total length of three minutes and thirty-eight seconds.

Track listing

Charts

Weekly charts

Year-end charts

References 

2013 singles
2013 songs
Songs written by Matthew Koma
Hardwell songs
Songs written by Hardwell